Lake Opataca is a body of water in the Broadback River watershed in the Eeyou Istchee James Bay (municipality) area in the Nord-du-Québec, in the province of Quebec, in Canada. This lake is part of territory of the Assinica Wildlife Sanctuary.

The southern part of the lake is part of the canton of Livilier. Lake Opataca is part of a group of lakes at the head of the [Broadback River].

Forestry is the main economic activity of the sector. Recreational tourism activities come second.

The surface of Opataca Lake is usually frozen from early November to mid-May, however, safe ice circulation is generally mid-November to mid-April.

Geography

Toponymy
This toponym was recorded around 1930 in a topographic survey of the region by the surveyor J.-M. Roy. Presumably of Cree origin, this toponym could mean "it is a pass, a narrow passage, on the water, between two elevations of ground".

The toponym "Lake Opataca" was formalized on December 5, 1968, by the Commission de toponymie du Québec, when it was created.

Notes and references

See also 

Eeyou Istchee James Bay
Lakes of Nord-du-Québec
LOpataca